is a Japanese football player, who is last played for S.League club Geylang International FC.

Career 
He played two seasons for Singapore side Albirex Niigata FC (Singapore) in the S.League after graduating from the JAPAN Soccer College. His primary role is a centre-back, but he can also play as a full-back.

Career statistics 

As @ 10 Oct 2021

References

1987 births
Living people
Japanese footballers
Komazawa University alumni
Expatriate footballers in Singapore
Japanese expatriate footballers
Japanese expatriate sportspeople in Singapore
Japan Soccer College players
Albirex Niigata Singapore FC players
Geylang International FC players
Singapore Premier League players
People from Niigata (city)
Association football defenders